Claudette Herbster-Josland (born 28 March 1946) is a French fencer. She won a silver medal in the women's team foil event at the 1972 Summer Olympics.

References

External links
 

1946 births
Living people
French female foil fencers
Olympic fencers of France
Fencers at the 1968 Summer Olympics
Fencers at the 1972 Summer Olympics
Fencers at the 1976 Summer Olympics
Olympic silver medalists for France
Olympic medalists in fencing
Sportspeople from Dijon
Medalists at the 1976 Summer Olympics
20th-century French women
21st-century French women